Duanmu is the Mandarin pinyin romanization of the Chinese compound surname written  in Chinese characters. It is romanized as Tuan-mu in Wade–Giles. Duanmu is listed 447th in the Song dynasty classic text Hundred Family Surnames. It is not among the 300 most common surnames in modern China.

Notable people
 Duanmu Ci or Zigong (520–456 BC), disciple of Confucius, one of the Twelve Philosophers
 Duanmu Shu (端木叔), Warring States period descendant of Duanmu Ci, known for his wealth and philanthropy
 Duan Fuchu or Duanmu Fuchu (端復初; 1321–1373), Ming dynasty Minister of Justice
 Duanmu Guohu (端木國瑚; 1773–1837), Qing dynasty official and scholar of the I Ching
 Duanmu Jie (端木傑; 1897–1972), Republic of China general and Minister of Transportation
 Joseph K. Twanmoh (端木愷 , 1903–1987), Republic of China politician, president of Soochow University (Taiwan)
 Duanmu Hongliang (1912–1996), novelist
 Lucy Duanmu (端木露西; 1912–1998), writer, wife of Chu Anping
 Duanmu Zheng (端木正; 1920–2006), Vice President of the Supreme People's Court of the PRC, son of Duanmu Jie
 Duanmu Mei (端木美), historian, daughter of Duanmu Zheng
 Duanmu San (端木三), professor of linguistics, University of Michigan

References

Chinese-language surnames
Individual Chinese surnames